Xuan Zan is a fictional character in Water Margin, one of the Four Great Classical Novels in Chinese literature. Nicknamed "Ugly Prince Consort", he ranks 40th among the 108 Stars of Destiny and fourth among the 72 Earthly Fiends.

Background
An eight chi tall skilled warrior, Xuan Zan is strikingly ugly with a face like the charred bottom of a wok, an upward pointing nose, hair messy like rank grass, and a red beard. He fights with a long sabre and is good in archery.

A prince is so impressed by Xuan Zan when he beats contestants from a foreign state in archery, bringing glory to the Song empire, that he marries his daughter to him. Xuan Zan is therefore nicknamed "Ugly Prince Consort". However, the princess is so unhappy with the marriage, finding his looks disgusting, that she soon falls ill and dies. As a result, Xuan Zan falls out of the prince's favour and is relegated to a low-ranking military position in a garrison unit of Dongjing, the imperial capital.

Becoming an outlaw
When the outlaws of Liangshan Marsh attack Daming Prefecture to rescue Lu Junyi and Shi Xiu, Grand Secretary Liang Shijie, the governor of Daming, seeks help from the Imperial Tutor Cai Jing, his father-in-law, in the Song imperial capital Dongjing. Xuan Zan, who is under Cai, recommends his friend Guan Sheng, a military inspector in Pudong County, as cut out for the job. With the assent of Cao, Xuan rushes to Pudong to summon Guan. Guan comes with his friend Hao Siwen to the imperial court, where he is tasked with saving Daming and the latter appointed his lieutenant together with Xuan Zan.

Guan Sheng adopts the strategy of attacking Liangshan to force Song Jiang to lift the siege on Daming. Things develop as he has expected. But, in face of many good fighters, Guan finds it a daunting task to squash Liangshan. Huyan Zhuo, a former imperial general who has gone over to Liangshan after failing to conquer the stronghold, comes to Guan one night alone, claiming that his capitulation to the outlaws is a sham. Guan is duped by Huyan to conduct a night raid on the camp of Song Jiang. When he gets there, he is pulled off his horse by hook wielders waiting in ambush and captured. Meanwhile, Xuan Zan is no match for Qin Ming and is seized too. Hao Siwen is caught by Hu Sanniang. Moved by the warm and kind treatment of Song Jiang, the three transfer their allegiance to Liangshan.

Informed of Guan Sheng's defection, Cai Jing orders Shan Tinggui and Wei Dingguo, two military instructors based in Lingzhou (凌州; in present-day Dezhou, Shandong), to mount another attack on Liangshan. Guan Sheng volunteers to take the fight to Lingzhou, with Xuan Zan and Hao Siwen as his assistants. In their first clash, Shan Tinggui and Wei Dingguo lure Hao and Xuan respectively into their battle ranks where they are engulfed by soldiers and captured. When Xuan and Hao are on the way being sent to Dongjing for punishment, the bandits of Mount Deadwood under Bao Xu, who is poised to join Liangshan invited by Li Kui, intercept the convoy and rescue them. Led by Li Kui, Xuan Zan, Hao Siwen, Bao Xu and Jiao Ting attack a gate of Lingzhou, causing its fall and the rout of Wei Dingguo's force. Like Shan Tinggui, who is earlier won over by Guan Sheng, Wei gives in to Liangshan when he finds himself cornered.

Campaigns and death
Xuan Zan is appointed as one of the leaders of the Liangshan cavalry after the 108 stars came together in what is called the Grand Assembly.  He participates in the campaigns against the Liao invaders and the rebel forces in Song territory following Emperor Huizong's amnesty for the outlaws.

In the battle of Suzhou in the campaign against Fang La, Xuan Zan and the enemy general Guo Shiguang slay each other under the Yinma Bridge.

References
 
 
 
 
 
 
 

72 Earthly Fiends